Jade Elizabeth Rose (born February 12, 2003) is a Canadian soccer player who plays as a defender for the Harvard Crimson in the Ivy League and the Canadian national team.

Early life
Rose began playing soccer with the Markham SC, before moving onto Unionville-Milliken SC, and then to the NDC Ontario Regional Excel (REX) Program.

College career
Rose was first approached by the Harvard Crimson women's soccer coaching staff in 2018. Rose committed to join Harvard University for the 2021-22 school year, also playing for the women's soccer team. She scored her first collegiate goal on September 2, 2021 against the Boston University Terriers. She scored her first game winning goal, in double overtime, on September 15, 2021 against the Northeastern Huskies. After a strong first year with the Crimson, she was named to the All-Ivy First Team and All-East Region First Team, the Top Drawer Soccer First-year Best XI, and was one of only three Ivy Leaguers named to the United Soccer Coaches' 2022 Women's Players to Watch list, as well as the MAC Hermann Trophy Watch List. 

After her sophomore season, she was named the Ivy League Defensive Player of the Year, as well as an Ivy League First Team All-Star. She was also named to the All-New England First-Team, a United Soccer Coaches Second Team All-American and All-East Region First Team.

Club career
In 2017, she played for Unionville-Milliken SC in League1 Ontario.

In 2022, she played with NDC Ontario in League1 Ontario.

International career
Early in her junior career, Rose represented Canada at the 2018 CONCACAF Girls' Under-15 Championship, 2018 CONCACAF Women's U-17 Championship, 2018 FIFA U-17 Women's World Cup, and 2020 CONCACAF Women's U-20 Championship. In 2019, she was invited to a camp for the  senior team for the first time. She was named the Canadian Youth International Female Player of the Year in 2020, after finishing as runner-up in 2019. In December 2021, she won the distinction for the second time.

Rose was named to the Canadian senior squad for the 2021 SheBelieves Cup, where she made her debut on February 21 against Argentina.

Joining Canada's U20 team again for 2022, Rose was named its captain in advance of the 2022 CONCACAF Women's U-20 Championship. The team finished in third place, in the process qualifying for the 2022 FIFA U-20 Women's World Cup, where Rose also competed. Following the U20 World Cup, Rose was called up to join Canada's senior team for two friendly matches played overseas against Australia. She took the field in the second match on September 6, and earned wide praise for her performance, both for success at frustrating Australian star forward Sam Kerr and for setting up the game-winning goal by Adriana Leon. The Guardian dubbed her "the star of the show."

References

External links 
 

2003 births
Living people
Canadian women's soccer players
Women's association football midfielders
Soccer people from Ontario
Canada women's international soccer players
Black Canadian women's soccer players
Unionville Milliken SC (women) players
Harvard Crimson women's soccer players
League1 Ontario (women) players